"Ambri" (also commonly known as "Mother") is a Punjabi language narrative poem by Anwar Masood.

It was inspired by a real event that happened in 1950, in which teacher Anwar Masood himself had an incident in his class, when one of his students beat his mother to almost death, while he was appointed as a schoolmaster in the village near Kunjah. Written in a time span of a decade between 1962 and 1972 (by Anwar's own accounts). It was first published in 1974 in Mela Akhiyan Da, and then a revised edition was published in 2007. It is written in a dialogue style with non-rhythmic scheme like Aik Pahar aur Gulehri of Allama Iqbal, except in pentameters rather than tetrameters. Poem reviewer Pashaura Singh Dhillon says about Anwar Masood as a poet, "He is a poet that has the rare gift of being able to take a very serious subject and make it light and entertaining".

It is considered as a magnum opus of Anwar, and most emotionally depicted poem about mothers love by him. It is often recited by Masood in annual mushairas, mother days and in annual all Pakistani Poets gathering. The book in which the poem was published comprises a total of 11 poems. Except for Ambri, all the other poems are comical poems. The book received highly positive reviews and till now, 40 editions of the book had been published across the country.

Inspiration

Poet Anwar Masood is widely known for his hysterical humour and comical poetry. At the same time, he writes classic genre of poetry. Ambri was one of his poems that depicted indescribable (according to him Unbayanable) love of a mother towards her son. Anwar Masood often describes how he got the inspiration for the poem:

He said that he tried to write two times about this incident but he was not satisfied with it as enough feelings were not there. Then, after ten years, when he was on his job in Pindigheb, he wrote about the whole incident and he didn't even have to change the names of the boys in his poem. He said that, at that time, he had come to realize that the poem had come to him with its own lines. It was meant to be written like this- a delayed poem, rather than when I was forcing myself to write it. He further said that this poem definitely was "Namz-e-Muarah".

Poem
Originally this poem was written in Punjabi and was published in his Punjabi book Akhiyan Da Mela which also includes ten other nazams, along with this poem, and was originally published in 1974. Following is the listing of the original, translated and the English version of the poem:

Reception
Ambri received highly positive response by the readers and critics. It was first published in Mela Akhiyan Da in 1974, a Punjabi language book that comprised eleven poems including Ambri. All poems were based on comical poetry (Makholya Shaairi) except Ambri. The book became a major hit and got a good critical reception. It was declared best seller of 1974. By 2012, the book has been published in 40 editions by the publishers Ferozsons. Ambri was considered as a 'masterpiece' by Anwar, as he blends his emotions about the incident in such a splendid form that one can not control himself, while reading, from bursting into tears. Ambri is highly requested by the audience in the Mushairas and in the annual gatherings of Pakistani poets. Ambri is adapted in many languages including Urdu, Hindi, Sanskrit, English and Persian.

Video presentation
In 2010, Ambri (originally given name Maa Di Shan) video presentation was  done by ATV Islamabad on the eve of Mother's Day. It stars Anwar Masood himself as a narrator of story, directed and produced by Muneeb Ahsan, co-produced and cinematography done by Umer Gulzar. The video was originally shot at Islamia School, Kunjha where this incident actually happened in 1950. The whole poem was narrated in Punjabi and translated and subtitled by Nargis Bano. This video presentation also received a positive response due to the stills and background music used in it, which blends the intensity of the poem into the deep emotions of a mother's love.

See also

Anwar Masood
List of Pakistani poets
List of Urdu language poets
List of Punjabi-language poets

References

External links
 Anwar Masood on Pakistan Academy of Letters 
 Anwar Masood on Facebook
 Anwar Masood on YouTube 
 Recorded poetry of Anwar Masood

1972 poems
1972 poetry books
Punjabi language
Punjabi poetry
Punjabi literature
Pakistani poetry
Pakistani literature
Ferozsons books